Ross Sterling may refer to:

 Ross S. Sterling (1875-1949), Texas governor
 Sterling High School (Houston), named for the governor
 Ross N. Sterling, (1931–1988), United States federal judge